The 24FPS International Short Film Festival (formerly WESTfest) is a two-day short film festival hosted in Abilene, Texas each year. An average of 20 shorts are selected and viewed at the Paramount Theatre, a restored theatre originally built in 1930.

External links 
WESTfest Short Film + Video Competition

References 

Film festivals in Texas
Short film festivals in the United States
Abilene, Texas
Tourist attractions in Taylor County, Texas